Alan S. Nakanishi, M.D., (b. March 21, 1940) is an American politician. He is the former mayor of the City of Lodi in San Joaquin County, having served four separate two-year terms. He was a Republican Assemblymember from California's 10th State Assembly district, serving from 2002 to 2008. In 2010, he was a candidate for the State Board of Equalization. Dr. Nakanishi advanced in the primary for California's 5th State Senate district to challenge incumbent Cathleen Galgiani in the 2016 General Election.

Early life
At the age of two, Alan Nakanishi and his family were subject to the Japanese American Internment following the signing of Executive Order 9066.  He and his family were relocated to Tule Lake, CA.  At the end of World War II, they moved to Sacramento, CA.  To make money while in school, Nakanishi worked picking fruit, and at a cannery.  He left after high school, and lived in Napa county, Los Angeles, and Texas before settling in Lodi, CA.  Nakanishi was in Texas while serving as a captain in the U.S. Army.

Education
Nakanishi received a B.A. in chemistry from Pacific Union College in 1961. He went on to receive a master's degree in health administration from Virginia Commonwealth University, and an M.D. from Loma Linda University. He completed his medical internship at USC Medical Center.

Military service
Nakanishi served two years as a Major in the U.S. Army, leading a Surgical Department at McDonald Army Hospital.

Medical practice
Since 1971, Nakanishi has practiced medicine in Stockton. He is the co-founder of the Delta Eye Medical Group, a six-physician group with offices in Lodi, Stockton, and Tracy.  He continued practicing in Lodi throughout his time in the State Assembly.

Public service career
In 2001, Nakanishi was elected to the Lodi City Council, in the Central Valley County of San Joaquin.

In 2000, he ran unsuccessfully for the California State Senate and remained on the Lodi City Council.

In 2001, he was selected Mayor of Lodi by his fellow Council members.

In 2002, he was elected to the California State Assembly. Nakanishi was the first Republican Co-Chair of the Asian-Pacific Islander Joint Legislative Caucus (2005–2008), as well as a member of the Rural Caucus and the Legislative Sporting Caucus.

In 2010, he was elected again to the Lodi City Council..

In 2012, he was selected again to serve as Mayor of Lodi by his fellow Council members.

In 2014, he was elected again to the Lodi City Council.

In 2016, he ran for the California state Senate, but lost to incumbent Democrat Cathleen Galgiani.

In 2017, he was selected again to serve as Mayor of Lodi by his fellow Council members.

References

http://www.lodinews.com/news/article_6962ec54-db9c-11e7-bdaa-0748abd42cfa.html

External links
 His campaign website
 Join California Alan Nakanishi
 

Living people
Pacific Union College alumni
Mayors of places in California
Republican Party members of the California State Assembly
American mayors of Japanese descent
American politicians of Japanese descent
American military personnel of Japanese descent
California politicians of Japanese descent
American physicians of Japanese descent
Japanese-American internees
People from Lodi, California
American ophthalmologists
American Seventh-day Adventists
United States Army officers
1940 births
21st-century American politicians
California city council members
Asian-American city council members
Asian conservatism in the United States